Tochigi City Football Club (栃木シティフットボールクラブ, Tochigi Shiti Futtobōrukurabu), commonly known as Tochigi City FC (栃木シティFC, Tochigi Shiti Efushi) is a Japanese football club based in Tochigi Prefecture. The club currently play in Kanto Soccer League part of Japanese Regional Leagues, the fifth tier of football league.

History
The club was formed in 1947 as Hitachi Tochigi Soccer Club, the works team of the local Hitachi, Ltd. affiliate.

After finishing as a runners-up in the local Kanto Soccer League in 2009 season, they were promoted to the 2010 Japan Football League through the All Japan Regional Football Promotion League Series. Prior to their first season in JFL, the club has dropped Hitachi prefix in its name and changed the reference to sport from "soccer" to "football" following general Japanese trend. From the 2019 season, the club has adopted the new name as "Tochigi City FC".

Origin name
In 2002 it adopted the moniker Uva (meaning "grape" in Italian, Portuguese and Spanish), after the vineyards of its home area, southern Tochigi Prefecture.

Current squad
As of July 28, 2022.

References

External links
  (in Japanese)
 
 
 Tochigi Uva FC U-15 U-12 Football School

Football clubs in Japan
Association football clubs established in 1947
Sports teams in Tochigi Prefecture
1947 establishments in Japan
Japan Football League clubs